Search/Rescue is a progressive rock band formed from the members of bands Gatsbys American Dream and Acceptance following their split-up. The band's debut album, titled The Compound  was released on CD in Japan in early 2008 and digitally in the US via iTunes and Amazon MP3 on February 26, 2008.

Line-up
 Ryan Van Wieringen - Vocals, guitar
 Bobby Darling - Guitar
 Kaylan Cloyd - Guitar
 Jerrod Bettis - Drums
 Ryan Zwiefelhofer - Guitar

History
In a forum post at Gatsbys fansite Snicker At The Swine, Bobby stated the following on the band's decision to release the album in Japan first and the reason they aren't signed to a label in the US:

Discography
 The Compound (2008)

References

External links
Search/Rescue on Myspace
Snicker At The Swine (Gatsbys American Dream Fansite)

Musical groups from Washington (state)
American progressive rock groups